Stefanie Haidner (born 18 November 1977) is a retired Austrian tennis player.

In her career, she won 18 doubles titles on the ITF Women's Circuit. Her career-high WTA singles ranking is 232, which she reached on 23 February 2004. On 19 July 2004, she peaked at No. 165 in the doubles rankings.

Haidner made her WTA Tour debut at the 2003 Linz Open, partnering Adriana Jerabek in doubles, but lost her quarterfinals match against fellow Marion Bartoli and Silvia Farina Elia. And at 2008 Gastein Ladies, partnering Hülya Esen in doubles, they lost in the first round.

Haidner retired from the professional tour 2015.

ITF finals

Singles (0–5)

Doubles (18–25)

External links
 
 

1977 births
Living people
Austrian female tennis players
Tennis players from Vienna
20th-century Austrian women
21st-century Austrian women